Elisa Rae Shupe (formerly Jamie Shupe; born James Clifford Shupe) is a retired United States Army soldier who in 2016 became the first person in the United States to obtain legal recognition of a non-binary gender. In 2019, she released a statement explaining that she had "returned to [her] male birth sex." In 2022 she published a statement reclaiming her trans identity and condemning the anti-trans movement due to her story being used to push conversion therapy.

Biography 
Assigned male at birth, Shupe was born in Washington, D.C., but grew up in southern Maryland as one of eight children. She and her wife, Sandy, were married in 1987. They have one daughter. She served in the U.S. Army for 18 years, receiving a number of military decorations, and retired in 2000 as a sergeant first class.

Shupe says she was physically and sexually abused by relatives during childhood. She recalls her mother punishing her for behaving like a "sissy", and says that she was denied the right to explore her gender expression or gender identity. That suppression continued through her military career, which included periods before and during Don't ask, don't tell. After she retired, Shupe began living as a transgender woman in 2013. She chose the gender-neutral first name "Jamie" and convinced the Army to change her sex marker to female on military records.

In June 2016, Shupe successfully petitioned a Multnomah County, Oregon, court to change her sex designation to non-binary, in the first legal recognition of a non-binary gender in the United States. That November, she was issued a birth certificate in Washington, D.C., with a sex marker of "unknown." Lambda Legal later cited Shupe's petition as a legal precedent for non-binary gender markers in the passport lawsuit Zzyym v. Pompeo. San Diego Gay and Lesbian News argued that her case was a "significant victory for the trans community".

Shupe critiqued gender-affirming surgery, cautioning against what she said were high complication rates. She also expressed opposition to transgender people serving in the military.

In January 2019, Shupe announced that she no longer identified as non-binary and was returning to identifying as male. Shupe expressed an intention to de-transition in an essay in a conservative publication, The Daily Signal. The essay went viral among opponents of transgender rights. Shupe spoke at a Family Policy Alliance event, and was then invited to a secretive group of anti-transgender-rights politicians lead by Fred Deutsch. Mentally unwell at the time, Shupe eventually felt exploited by the conservative groups.

In 2021, she began using the name "Lisa Shupe", and in 2022 published a statement that during her detransition she helped sell conversion therapy to the public while privately self-medicating with estrogen, which resulted in a life-threatening blood clot. She stated: "I also authored this to hopefully prevent these groups from further using me as a pawn in their vicious war, legislative and otherwise, against the transgender community. For the record, I have formally renounced my previous ties and allegiance to radical and gender-critical feminists, conservatives, and faith-based groups." Shortly after in 2022, she received a legal name change to "Elisa Rae Shupe".

In March 2023, Shupe leaked over 2600 pages of emails, spanning a period from 2017 to 2023, between her and a group of what Mother Jones calls "representatives of a network of activists and organizations at the forefront of the anti-trans movement".

See also 
 List of non-binary people

References

External links 
 James Shupe contributor profile at The Daily Signal

1963 births
American LGBT military personnel
LGBT people from Washington, D.C.
Living people
Military personnel from Washington, D.C.
People who detransitioned
United States Army soldiers
Transgender women
Transgender military personnel